The Kingdom of the Slavs is a book by Mavro Orbini published in the Italian city of Pesaro in 1601. The book provided a history of the Slavic peoples.

The historical context of the work is the Long Turkish War and the loss of the position of the southern Slavs in the rule of the Ottoman Empire after the hanging of Michael Kantakouzenos Şeytanoğlu (March 3, 1578) and the assassination of Grand Vizier Sokollu Mehmed Pasha (October 11, 1579). The Venetian Republic, through its protégés, Validе Sultanas, succeeded in displacing the Republic of Dubrovnik from its position in the Mediterranean trade by constructing a port in Split.

After Peter the Great declared himself Emperor, his first order was to translate into Russian and publish this book. The book played a huge role in the emergence of pan-Slavism.

Further reading
 "Indetermi-Nation: Narrative identity and symbolic politics in early modern Illyrism" by Zrinka Blažević, in Whose Love of Which Country?: Composite States, National Histories and Patriotic Discourses in Early Modern East Central Europe], Koninklijke Brill (2010)
 Croatia: A Nation Formed in War by Marcus Tanner, Yale University Press (1997)
 Entangled Histories Of The Balkans - Volume One ed. by Roumen Dontchev Daskalov and Tchavdar Marinov, Koninklijke Brill (2013)
 When Ethnicity Did Not Matter in the Balkans: A Study of Identity in Pre-Nationalist Croatia, Dalmatia, and Slavonia in the Medieval and Early-Modern Periods by Larry Wolff, Stanford University Press (2002)
 Our Kingdom Come: The Counter-Reformation, the Republic of Dubrovnik, and the Liberation of the Balkan Slavs by Zdenko Zlatar, East European Monographs (1992)

References

See also
 Grandfather Ivan
 Moscow, third Rome

17th-century history books
Historiography of Bulgaria